Jang is a Town and Subdivision in Tawang district, Arunachal Pradesh, India. As per the 2011 Census of India, Jang has a population of 5,480.

Demography 
Jang subdivision has a total of 8 villages. Below is the list of villages under the Jang subdivision:

Tourist place 
The Nuranang Falls or the Jang Falls, famous for Koyla movie's song shooting and MVC (posthumous) Jaswant Singh Rawat's fearless fight unto death during Sino-Indian war in 1962, driving 40 Km from Tawang.

References 

Arunachal Pradesh
Tawang district
Tourism in India